Carebarella is a genus of ant in the subfamily Myrmicinae.

Species
 Carebarella alvarengai Kempf, 1975
 Carebarella bicolor Emery, 1906
 Carebarella condei Borgmeier, 1937

References

External links

Myrmicinae
Ant genera